The Sharon government refers to the Israeli government when it was led by Prime Minister Ariel Sharon. It may refer to:
 The Twenty-ninth government of Israel
 The Thirtieth government of Israel